Ralph Harvey (August 9, 1901 – November 7, 1991) was an American politician who served six terms as a U.S. Representative from Indiana from 1947 to 1959, then again for three more terms from 1961 to 1966.

Biography 
Born on a farm near Mount Summit, Indiana, Harvey attended the public schools.
He graduated from Purdue University, Lafayette, Indiana, 1923. He was an agricultural instructor and a farmer. Additionally, he served as county councilman from 1932 to 1942 and as a member of the Indiana House of Representatives from 1942 to 1947.

Congress 
Harvey was elected as a Republican to the Eightieth Congress to fill the vacancy caused by the death of United States Representative Raymond S. Springer.
He was re-elected to the five succeeding Congresses (November 4, 1947 – January 3, 1959).
He was an unsuccessful candidate for reelection to the Eighty-sixth Congress in 1958.

Harvey was elected as a Republican to the Eighty-seventh and to the two succeeding Congresses and served until his resignation on December 30, 1966 (January 3, 1961-December 30, 1966).
Harvey voted in favor of the Civil Rights Acts of 1957 and 1964, as well as the 24th Amendment to the U.S. Constitution, but did not vote on the Voting Rights Act of 1965.
He was an unsuccessful candidate for renomination to the Ninetieth Congress in 1966.

Death
He died on November 7, 1991, in Fort Lauderdale, Florida.

References

1901 births
1991 deaths
Purdue University alumni
Republican Party members of the Indiana House of Representatives
People from Henry County, Indiana
20th-century American politicians
Republican Party members of the United States House of Representatives from Indiana